Prax may refer to:

 Prax (malware), or Regin, a malware and hacking toolkit
 Prax Group, operators of Lindsey Oil Refinery, North Killingholme, North Lincolnshire, England
 Praso, Italy (German: Prax), a former comune in Trentino, Italy
 Mike Prax (born 1956), American politician from Alaska
 Valentine Prax (1897–1981), French expressionist and cubist painter